The 2005 Rhode Island Rams football team was an American football team that represented the University of Rhode Island in the Atlantic 10 Conference during the 2005 NCAA Division I-AA football season. In their sixth season under head coach Tim Stowers, the Rams compiled a 4–7 record (2–6 against conference opponents) and finished in a tie for last place in the North Division of the Atlantic 10 Conference.

Schedule

References

Rhode Island
Rhode Island Rams football seasons
Rhode Island Rams football